Justo Lukbán y Rilles (May 28, 1863 – September 2, 1927) was a Filipino physician and politician. Lukban was elected to the Philippine Assembly and was mayor of the capital Manila from 1917 until 1920.

Early life
Justo Lukban was born in Labo, nowadays part of the Philippine province of Camarines Norte. He was the second child from a family of six children of Agustin Lukbán and Andrea Rilles. One of his three brothers was General Vicente Lukbán. He enrolled in 1873 at the Colegio de San Juan de Letran where he achieved a Bachelor of Arts-degree. Afterwards, Lukban studied medicine at the University of Santo Tomas. In 1888, he achieved his medical license and started his own practice in Manila.

Philippine Revolution and Philippine-American War
After the outbreak of the Philippine Revolution Lukban joined the revolutionary movement, just like his brother Vicente. He served as a medical officer. After the signing of the Pact of Biak-na-Bato on December 15, 1897, Lukban left for Hong Kong together with Emilio Aguinaldo and other Filipino leaders, where they lived in voluntary exile. In Augustus 1898 he was named by Vincente Lukban as Councilor to the Central Directorate of the Hong Kong Junta. After his return to the Philippines in 1898, Lukban represented the province of as one of the members of the Malolos Congress. He was a member of the Council of Defense and Aid and head of the Medical Faculty at the newly established Universidad Literaria de Filipinas.

He served as a General in the Siege of Masbate on August 19, 1898. Authorized to collect money for the revolutionary cause, he managed to collect an amount of ₱20,200 for the Revolutionary Government. When the Philippine Revolutionary Army was defeated in central Luzon by the Americans, Lukban was one of the negotiators for a peaceful surrender to the US as a member of the Asociacion De Paz, which was led by Pedro Paterno and Felipe Buencamino. During that time he had the rank of Major. After his surrender, the Americans appointed him as Military Sanitary Health Inspector for Ambos Camarines.

Political career
In 1902 Lukban founded, together with Jose Maria de la Viña, Albert Barreto and León María Guerrero, the Partido Democrata, which pledged for Philippine independence through peaceful means. In May 1903, Lukban charged the Manila Jockey Club with infringing the Municipal Ordinance, as he claimed horse races are a game of chance and are cruel, with no benefits to horse breeding. In 1906, Lukban was the editor of the La Independencia newspaper, a newspaper which pledged for Philippine autonomy.

In January 1907, Lukban ran for the leadership election of the Partido Popular Independista, which urged immediate independence from the United States of America. To prevent further split, Alberto Barretto and Justo Lukban were elected co-leaders of the party. On March 12, 1907, the Union Nacionalista and the Independistas merged to form the Partido Nacionalista. The Nacionalistas split their ranks when Guerrero and Lukban, members of the old Independista group were dropped from the ticket in favor of Dominador Gomez and Felipe del Pan. In 1907, he took part in the elections for the Philippine Assembly, on behalf of the 1st Legislative District of Manila. He lost the elections to Dominador Gomez. Guerrero and Lukban ultimately set up the Liga Nacional Independencia whose sole purpose was to contest the 1907 elections.

Lukban ran for the election of Speaker of the Assembly, however Gomez defeated him by 31 votes. Gomez was found to be a Spanish citizen and a new election for his seat in the 1st Philippine Legislature was called. Gomez still ran in the March 30 election and defended his seat, beating Lukban by a larger margin of 425 votes. However, on June 18 Gomez resigned his rights to his seat, so a second election was called. The 1908 Manila's 1st assembly district special elections for the vacant seat were thereafter won by Lukban on August 11, 1908. At the end of his term in 1909, he was re-elected. This time, Gomez successfully challenged the election results in court, because Lukban did not conform to the requirement that a candidate needs to reside within his Legislative District. Lukban in turn resigned on January 26, 1911 and Gomez was declared the true winner of the 1909 election for the vacant seat.

On January 16, 1917, Lukban was appointed as the third Mayor of Manila. During his term as mayor, which would last until March 6, 1920, Rizal Avenue and the Jones Bridge were built. Lukban is mostly known as mayor for his attempts to rid Manila of its prostitutes. Following the suggestion of then-House Speaker Sergio Osmeña, he shipped a group of 181 prostitutes to Davao, Mindanao, from October 16–25, 1918. The case caused controversy after the Philippine press wrote about it. In 1920, Governor-General of the Philippines Leonard Wood appointed Lukban to President of the Board of Appeals.

Later life
After his retirement, he stayed with his daughter in Zurbaran Street, Santa Cruz, Manila. Lukban died in on September 2, 1927 at the age of 64, of a heart ailment. He is buried in Manila North Cemetery.

References

Sources
 Zoilo M. Galang, Encyclopedia of the Philippines, 3 ed. Vol III., E. Floro, Manila (1950)
 Carlos Quirino, Who's who in Philippine history, Tahanan Books, Manila (1995)

1863 births
1927 deaths
Mayors of Manila
Members of the House of Representatives of the Philippines from Camarines Norte
People of the Philippine–American War
Paramilitary Filipinos
Colegio de San Juan de Letran alumni
People from Camarines Norte
University of Santo Tomas alumni
Burials at the Manila North Cemetery
Members of the Philippine Legislature
Members of the Malolos Congress
Nacionalista Party politicians
Bicolano people